The Ythan  is a river in the north-east of Scotland rising at Wells of Ythan near the village of Ythanwells and flowing south-eastwards through the towns of Fyvie, Methlick and Ellon before flowing into the North Sea near Newburgh, in Formartine.

The lower reach of the river is known as the Ythan Estuary, is a part of the River Ythan, Sands of Forvie and Meikle Loch Special Protection Area for conservation, particularly the breeding ground of three tern species (common tern, little tern and Sandwich tern) (Lumina, 2004).

As figures of the discharge, /s are given or /s.

Nitrate Vulnerable Zone
The Scottish Government has designated the River Ythan catchment as a Nitrate Vulnerable Zone following concerns about the spread of algal mats in the river during the 1990s. The resulting restrictions on the use of fertilisers in the catchment were criticised by many farmers, 90% of the land in the catchment area is used for agriculture. However, the designation and subsequent actions to solve the issue under the European Union's LIFE Fund's Ythan Project have led to improvements in water quality as an increasing number of farmers used techniques such as the creation of buffer strips between their fields and the river and nutrient budgeting. Both the increase in agri-environment schemes in the area and the individual river restoration work undertaken under the auspices of the Ythan Project have led to an increase in wildlife habitat in the Ythan's catchment.

Etymology
The name Ythan may be derived from a Brittonic source, cognate with Old Welsh eith meaning "gorse" (Welsh eithin) or else, from an early *Iectona meaning "talkative one" (Welsh iaith; c.f. River Ithon).

Fishing
The area of the Ythan is part of a protected region, in order to preserve Atlantic salmon and sea trout.

See also
 Ythan Wells Roman Camp site

References

 Lumina Technologies, Ythan Estuary, Aberdeenshire, Aberdeen Library archives, June, 2004

Special Protection Areas in Scotland
Ythan
Ramsar sites in Scotland